The Mirage is a book written by Jamal Sanad Al-Suwaidi, Director of the Emirates Center for Strategic Studies and Research in Abu Dhabi, UAE.  This book, originally published in Arabic as “Al-Sarab” ,  is a review of the history, origin, evolution, practices and objectives of  political Islam in Arab and Muslim societies. It also explains the danger of related political religious groups. Its title is a metaphor about the misleading religious solutions proposed by Islamist groups, to contemporary social problems.

Summary
The Mirage highlights the struggle of the Arab and Islamic world against the actions of religious extremist organizations that pose military and security threats but also a significant intellectual challenge. One of its main objectives is to protect future generations from the misleading calls of “rebuilding the Islamic Islamic Caliphate” from Islamist groups that do not represent true Islam. After careful research on the intellectual, political, cultural and social implications of religious extremism, its author Al-Suwaidi suggests appropriate solutions such as “separating religion from power”.  The book also emphasizes Islam as a source of identity and social cohesion in both the Arab and Islamic world.

The author tracks the historical evolution of  the phenomenon of religious extremism and studies specific examples from their inception through their peak in the early 2010s, to their downfall. In particular, he explains the causes of  recent failures of the Muslim Brotherhood-led governments that took power in some Arab and Muslim countries. Then, Al-Suwaidi exposes the fallacy of the slogans that attracted such veneration among sympathizers. He advocates “separating religion from power” as a method of dealing with this issue.

The book suggests similarities between certain aspects of the ideologies and practices in the European Middle Ages and the  intellectual and political structures,  relationship between religion and politics, the role of clergy in religious extremist groups in the modern Arab and Muslim world.

For researchers, decision makers and the general public, this book reveals the intellectual and ideological characteristics of religious extremist groups and appears as an effort to deconstruct the various obstacles they pose to progress and development in Arab and Muslim countries.

The Mirage poses five main existential questions:

 Modern Arab and Muslim countries may be reenacting the same political and religious battle fought by Europeans five centuries ago during the Middle Ages. If this assumption is true, are Islamic civilizations lagging five centuries behind their European counterparts? 
 Should we consider religious Dark Ages as prerequisites for reaching modern civilization as we know it? 
 Can a modern, secular civilization coexist with religion and include its teachings?
 Why do some groups in Arab and Muslim societies consider that a religious discourse should end where progress and development start?
 Why have referential concepts been overwhelmed by destructive ideas disseminated by political religious groups?

Reception

Book reviews
Mohamed Noman Galal, a Member of the Egyptian Council of Foreign Relations, former Egyptian Ambassador and author reviewed the book. Galal recognized it as "a scholarly encyclopedia that is based on careful research, references and multiple end notes to objectively establish each and every fact it contains (without hypocrisy, prejudice or delusion)"

Abdul Hamid Al-Ansari,  wrote a review of The Mirage in an article titled "The Mirage: An Islamic Religious Perspective". Al-Ansari said that: "I recognize that the book offers a mature and insightful view on the instructions, guidance and values of Islam, in terms of the transformation of the individual and society"

Events

In March 2015,  Shaikh Mohammad Bin Rashid Al Maktoum, Vice-president, Prime minister of the UAE and Ruler of Dubai, received a copy of the Arabic version of the book. In addition, during a meeting held at Abu Dhabi police general police headquarters, Sheikh Saif bin Zayed Al Nahyan, Deputy Prime Minister and Minister of Interior of UAE, was presented with the book.

On 8 March 2015, Sheikh Hamad bin Mohammed Al Sharqi, member of the Supreme Council and ruler of Fujairah, received a copy of the book and said that it elucidates facts about the misuse of Islam by extremist groups.

On April 14, 2015, the United Arab Emirates University organized a symposium to review and discuss The Mirage. On 19 May 2015, the book was also the subject of a gathering at the Emirates Center for Strategic Studies and Research  in Abu Dhabi themed The Mirage: Enlightened Thought in Countering Terrorism.

See also
 Political aspects of Islam
 Islam and secularism
 Islamism

References

Further reading
  Jamal Sanad  Al-Suwaidi (2014) Islamic Political Movements and Authority in the Arab World: The Rise and Fall.  Emirates Center for Strategic Studies and Research in Abu Dhabi. .
 Ayoob, Mohammed. The Many Faces of Political Islam: Religion and Politics in the Muslim World. University of Michigan Press, 2007.
Marina Ottoway, et al.,  Democratic Mirage in the Middle East, Carnegie Endowment for Ethics and International Peace, Policy Brief 20, (October 20, 2002).

External links 
 Emirates Center For Strategic Studies And Research
 Islam and Politics from the Dean Peter Krogh Foreign Affairs Digital Archives
 Liberal Democracy and Political Islam: The Search for Common Ground
 Evaluating the Islamist movement by Greg Noakes, an American Muslim who works at the Washington Report.

Books about Islam and society
2014 non-fiction books
Islam and politics
Islamism